Zygostelma benthamii is a species of flowering plant in the family Apocynaceae native to eastern Asia. It is the only species in the genus Zygostelma and was first formally named in 1890.

References

Periplocoideae
Flora of Asia
Monotypic Apocynaceae genera